Field of Love is the second studio album by Canadian singer-songwriter Caila Thompson-Hannant, under her pseudonym Mozart's Sister It was released on February 17, 2017 through Arbutus Records.

Track listing

References

2017 albums
Arbutus Records albums